Hes family bHLH transcription factor 3 is a protein that in humans is encoded by the HES3 gene.

References

Further reading